Jonathan David Henry Rowe (born 30 April 2003) is an English professional footballer who plays as a winger for EFL Championship club Norwich City.

Club career
A youth product of Norwich City, Rowe signed his first professional contract with the club on 20 October 2021.

He was nominated for the December 2021 Premier League 2 player of the month after some impressive performances for Norwich City's Under-23s. He made his professional debut with Norwich on 28 December 2021, coming on as a late substitute in the 68th minute in a 3–0 Premier League loss to Crystal Palace.

Career statistics

References

External links
 

2003 births
Living people
English footballers
Association football wingers
Norwich City F.C. players
Premier League players
Black British sportsmen